is a Japanese ski jumper.

He participated at the FIS Nordic World Ski Championships 2019, winning a medal.

Major Tournament results

FIS World Nordic Ski Championships

Ski Flying World Championships

World Cup results

Standings

Wins

Individual starts (110)

References

External links

1995 births
Living people
Japanese male ski jumpers
FIS Nordic World Ski Championships medalists in ski jumping
Ski jumpers at the 2017 Asian Winter Games
Asian Games medalists in ski jumping
Medalists at the 2017 Asian Winter Games
Asian Games gold medalists for Japan
Ski jumpers at the 2012 Winter Youth Olympics
Ski jumpers at the 2022 Winter Olympics
Olympic ski jumpers of Japan